The Inishowen Football League (IOFL) is an amateur league for football clubs in the Inishowen peninsula of County Donegal, Ireland. There are three divisions, with a promotion-and-relegation system in operation. This three-division setup, introduced in 2016, replaced a structure that had been in place for twenty years.

The season runs from late August to May. The league is featured in much of Inishowen's media, such as the Inish Times and the Inishowen Independent. 

The current champions are Greencastle, who won the 2021-22 Premier Division season.

History 
The Inishowen Football League was formed in 1988 with people representing their towns to play in small tournaments and the main league itself.

Clubs

League format 
The league is split up into three divisions: the Jackie Crossan Premier Division, the Strand Hotel First Division and the Inishowen Engineering Second Division. The divisions function with a promotion-and-relegation system.

Teams for the 2022-23 season

Jackie Crossan Premier Division 

 Aileach
 Buncrana Hearts
 Clonmany Shamrocks
 Cockhill Celtic Youths
 Culdaff
 Glengad United
 Greencastle
 Illies Celtic
 Moville Celtic

Strand Hotel First Division 

 Aileach Reserves
 Buncrana Reserves
 Carndonagh
 Clonmany Shamrocks Reserves
 Dunree United
 Gleneely Colts
 Greencastle Youths
 Quigley's Point Swifts
 Redcastle United

Inishowen Engineering Second Division 

 Aileach Youths
 Carndonagh Reserves
 Carrowmena
 Cockhill Celtic Reserves
 Culdaff Reserves
 Dunree United Reserves
 Glengad United Reserves
 Illies Celtic Reserves
 Moville Celtic Reserves
 Quigleys Point Youths
 Rashenny
 Rashenny Reserves
 Redcastle United Reserves
 Sea Rovers

Honours

Premier League winners 
Clonmany Shamrocks have won the most titles with six championships.
 2021-22 - Greencastle
 2020-21 - NO SEASON
 2019–20 - Aileach
 2018–19 - Greencastle
 2017–18 - Glengad United
 2016–17 - Glengad United
 2015–16 - Glengad United
 2014–15 - Glengad United
 2013–14 - Carndonagh
 2012–13 - Clonmany Shamrocks
 2011–12 - Aileach
 2010–11 - Clonmany Shamrocks
 2009–10 - Redcastle United
 2008–09 - Redcastle United
 2007–08 - Clonmany Shamrocks
 2006–07 - Redcastle United
 2005–06 - Redcastle United
 2004–05 - Cockhill Celtic
 2003–04 - Illies Celtic
 2002–03 - Illies Celtic
 2001–02 - Clonmany Shamrocks
 2000–01 - Clonmany Shamrocks
 1999–2000 - Cockhill Celtic
 1998–99 - Culdaff 
 1997–98 - Moville Celtic
 1996–97 - Quigley's Point Swifts
 1995–96 - Newtown 
 1994–95 - Clonmany Shamrocks
 1993–94 - Quigley's Point Swifts
 1992–93 - Quigley's Point Swifts
 1991–92 - Cockhill Celtic
 1990–91 - Cockhill Celtic
 1989–90 - Illies Celtic
 1988–89 - Cockhill Celtic

Cup competitions

Clubman Shirts League Cup 
This cup competition is fought out between the Premier and First Division teams in a mini league and then knockout format. This competition begins prior to the start of the league and played out through the season.

Buncrana Credit Union Cup 
This cup competition is played between teams from the Premier and First Divisions in a knockout format only.

Hannon Greene Father O'Gara Cup 
The Father O'Gara Cup is one of the most famous and historic competition in the league. The format is every team from the First and Second Division compete against one another in a knockout format. First teams and their reserve teams may compete against one another if they are drawn to play. Mainly it has been the First Division teams that make the final. The competition lasts all the way through the season and is very popular throughout the peninsula.

Donegal Signs Reserve League Shield 
This competition is played between the Second Division teams in a knockout format. It is played prior to the start of the league campaign.

FAI Junior Cup 
Teams from the Premier and First Divisions take part in the FAI Junior Cup, which features 600-plus teams from around the country. Teams who do well in the Jackie Crossan Premier are invited to compete against other clubs from around Ulster. Teams from the Inishowen Football League have been competing in the cup for a long time and continue still.

Players 

The players of the league consist of many people from around Inishowen. The league also has its own ladies league. Players are free to join whichever team they want before the season starts. Players cannot switch teams during the regular season unless they request a transfer from the league. There have been a lot of local people that have a reputation for playing in the league. Most of these people stay in the league after their playing careers and move on to management of a club.

Notable former players 

 Stephen McLaughlin

Football pitches 
Facilities for playing football matches in the league have improved rapidly over the last number of years. The most improved is Culdaff's Caratra Park. After the addition of floodlights, Culdaff now play their home games on Saturday nights. The new addition saw a high attendance in Caratra Park on the first game they were played under them. Club houses with changing rooms and showers have been added to nearly every park.

For cup finals, or any other tournament the league is involved with, Maginn Park is where these games are held. Maginn Park is located in Buncrana and is serving as one of the most important pitches in the league.

References

External links
Inishowen Football League official website

7
Association football leagues in Ulster
Association football leagues in County Donegal